Psilochorus apicalis is a species of cellar spider in the family Pholcidae. It is found in the USA.

References

Further reading

 
 
 
 
 
 
 
 

Pholcidae
Spiders described in 1921